Brian Bell (born February 24, 1989) is an American wheelchair basketball player and a member of the United States men's national wheelchair basketball team.

Career
Bell has represented the United States in Wheelchair basketball at the Summer Paralympics twice, winning gold medals in 2016 and 2020.

References

1989 births
Living people
American men's wheelchair basketball players
Medalists at the 2015 Parapan American Games
Medalists at the 2019 Parapan American Games
Paralympic wheelchair basketball players of the United States
Wheelchair basketball players at the 2016 Summer Paralympics
Wheelchair basketball players at the 2020 Summer Paralympics
Medalists at the 2016 Summer Paralympics
Medalists at the 2020 Summer Paralympics
Paralympic medalists in wheelchair basketball
Paralympic gold medalists for the United States
Basketball players from Birmingham, Alabama
21st-century American people